Amblychia is a genus of moths in the family Geometridae described by Achille Guenée in 1857.

Description
Palpi upturned, reaching vertex of head and fringed with long hair in front. Antenna of male usually bipectinated with long branches to three-fourths length. Hind tibia usually dilated and with a tuft of hair from base on inner side. Forewings of male with fovea. Apex somewhat acute and produced. Vein 3 from before angle of cell and veins 7 to 9 stalked from before upper angle. Vein 11 free. Hindwings with produced outer margin at vein 4. Vein 3 from before angle of cell.

Species
 Amblychia angeronaria Guenée, 1857
 Amblychia cavimargo (Prout, 1925)
 Amblychia hymenaria (Guenée, 1857)
 Amblychia infoveata Prout, 1932
 Amblychia lutulenta (West)
 Amblychia moltrechti (Bastelberger, 1909)
 Amblychia nimia (Prout, 1925)
 Amblychia pardicelata (Walker, [1863])
 Amblychia praeumbrata (Warren, 1893)
 Amblychia sauteri (Prout, 1914)
 Amblychia sommereri Holloway, 1993
 Amblychia subrubida (Warren, 1896)
 Amblychia torrida Moore

References

 

Boarmiini
Geometridae genera